The Saint Ignatios Monastery is found outside the city of Kalloni on the island of Lesbos, Greece, and is also known as the Limonas Monastery or the Limonos Monastery (alternative spelling), due to the field on which it is built. The monastery was founded in 1526 by Saint Ignatios Agallianos.

The monastery contains many important relics collected since its founding, and houses a library which contains many manuscripts and icons. It now has over 2,500 volumes of books and 450 manuscripts and Greek and Ottoman documents.

References 
 Leimonos Monastery
 Monastery of Leimon (Moni Leimonos)

External links 
Photos

1526 establishments in Europe
Greek Orthodox monasteries in Greece
Churches in Lesbos